The 2018 Kerry Senior Football Championship was the 117th edition of Kerry GAA's premier gaelic football tournament for senior teams in County Kerry, Ireland. The tournament consists of 17 teams (8 club teams and 9 divisional teams), with the winners representing Kerry in the Munster Senior Club Football Championship if they are a club team. If the winners are a divisional team the winners of the Kerry Club Football Championship represent the county.

The championship has a back-door format for the first two rounds before proceeding to a knock-out format. Generally, any team to lose two matches will be knocked out of the championship.

This was An Ghaeltacht's return to the senior ranks, meaning they will no longer provide players to the West Kerry District panel for this season. Kilcummin (who were relegated to the I.F.C. for 2018) will provide the East Kerry Divisional side with players for the S.F.C.

Dr. Crokes were the 2017 champions after they defeated South Kerry in the final.

Format Structure Change
8 club teams and 9 divisional teams (17 in total) will take part in this year's S.F.C. It was decided that only 8 divisional sides would take part in the competition proper so the 2 lowest ranked divisional sides from the previous 5 years would play off in a qualification match with the winner entering the draw for the 2017 County Championship proper.

Relegation (See below): The club team to be relegated from the Senior County Championship will be the same team to be relegated from the Senior Club Championship (The 8 senior clubs play off against each other in Round 1 of the Club Championship. The 4 losers enter a relegation playoff with the losers entering a relegation final. This loser will be relegated to the I.F.C. for 2017. Should a club reach the final of the County championship they will be exempt from the Relegation process in the Club championship).

The winner of the 2017 I.F.C. will be promoted to the 2018 Senior County and Club Championships.

Team changes

To Championship

Promoted from the Kerry Intermediate Football Championship
 An Ghaeltacht

From Championship

Relegated to the Kerry Intermediate Football Championship
 Kilcummin

Participating Teams
The teams taking part in the 2018 Kerry Senior Football Championship are:

Results

Preliminary round

Round 1

Round 2A

Round 2B

Round 3

Quarter-finals

Semi-finals

Final

Relegation

The club team to be relegated from the Senior County Championship will be the same team to be relegated from the Senior Club Championship. The 8 senior clubs play off against each other in Round 1 of the Club Championship. The 4 losers enter a relegation playoff with the losers entering a relegation final. This loser will be relegated to the I.F.C. for 2019. Should a club reach the final of the County championship they will be exempt from the Relegation process in the Club championship.

Championship statistics

Top scorers

Overall

In a single game

Miscellaneous

 Dr. Crokes overtook Austin Stacks to go top of the roll of honour for the first time with a 13th title.
 An Ghaeltacht returned to the senior championship for the first time since 2009.

References

Kerry Senior Football Championship
Kerry Senior Football Championship
Kerry SFC